XHOCL-FM (99.3 MHz), is a radio station in Tijuana, Baja California, Mexico, owned by MVS Radio. It carries a Spanish AC and English AC format known as FM Globo. The station's studios are located in the Agua Caliente neighborhood of Tijuana, with its transmitter on a tower on Av. Club 20–30. It is one of two stations to carry FM Globo.

History
The concession history for XHOCL begins in the late 1960s, with tentative approval to establish XHQS-FM on 96.1 MHz. This station would have been owned by XHQS, S.A., in turn owned by Guillermo Núñez Keith. Instead, XHQS, S.A., part of Víctor Díaz's Califórmula Broadcasting, received the concession for XHKY-FM 95.7 on June 5, 1975. In the 1980s it was known as "Fiesta Mexicana" with a Regional Mexican format.

In the late 1980s, a binational frequency conflict led to a series of changes at XHKY. XHKY raised its power, causing interference to KKOS, a radio station on 95.9 FM at Carlsbad, California. Ultimately, KKOS and XHKY reached a deal, which was agreed to by the FCC and SCT; on September 15, 1995, XHKY moved to 99.3 at 25,000 watts, KKOS moved to 95.7 at 25,000 watts, and the previous occupant of 99.3, XHATE-FM Tecate, moved to 95.3 MHz.

In the late 1990s, XHKY changed its callsign to XHHCR-FM and flipped from "X99 Fiesta Mexicana" to "Hot Country Radio (branded as XHCR on air)"; the XHCR callsign was not available as it was already in use by a Morelia, Michoacán FM outlet. In 2002, XHHCR was sold to Clear Channel Communications and its Mexican affiliate XETRA Comunicaciones, S.A. de C.V. The new ownership changed the name of the station to "Country Music Bob" while maintaining the format; this later moved to KUSS 95.7. From January 5, 2004 until August 31, 2005, the format was Oldies known as "KOOL 99.3"; with this format flip came another new callsign, XHOCL-FM (referred to as XOCL). At 6 a.m., September 1, 2005, the format flipped to Spanish language oldies known as "La Preciosa".

Clear Channel was forced to sell the stations it operated in Mexico after a 2003 FCC ruling that ruled those stations counted against US ownership caps. As a consequence, XHOCL was sold to MVS Radio. On August 1, 2007 the station flipped to MVS's "La Mejor" grupera format. On October 1, 2011, XHOCL flipped to Spanish AC, branded as "Diego 99.3" as sister station XHTIM 90.7 took on the La Mejor format.

On January 21, 2019, XHOCL flipped to Spanish adult contemporary, as MVS brought the "FM Globo" brand to Tijuana, replacing Diego. FM Globo is also heard in the Imperial Valley and Mexicali on XHPF-FM.

External links
Official website

References

Radio stations in Tijuana
Radio stations established in 1975
1975 establishments in Mexico
MVS Radio